Little Chico Creek is a perennial stream in Butte County, California. It descends the Sierra Nevada foothills from a spring off Headwaters Road in Forest Ranch, CA, flowing westward into the Parrot Grant which is just south of Ord Ferry Road and west of Seven Mile Lane where it just disappears.

The creek flows through the city Chico, where it bounds the downtown area on its south side. It can be seen in Chico from Highway 99 just south of the Chester/Orland exit; from the Park Avenue bridge just south of downtown; and from where Dayton Road begins. There is a greenway adjacent to the creek with a path that follows Humboldt Road. This path provides access to a footbridge over the creek that goes into a residential area. In the area just west of the town's railroad tracks its flow becomes seasonal, with most or all of its water infiltrating into the ground by summer.

Dead Horse Slough is a tributary of Little Chico Creek.

See also 
 Big Chico Creek

References 
 United States Geological Survey. 1981.

End notes 

Rivers of Butte County, California
Geography of Chico, California
Geography of the Sacramento Valley
Rivers of the Sierra Nevada (United States)
Rivers of Northern California
Rivers of the Sierra Nevada in California